Neil Perriam McGregor (29 December 1901 – 12 July 1973) was a New Zealand rugby union player. He played 27 matches for the All Blacks including two internationals. He went on to serve as the selector and coach of the  provincial side from 1961 to 1963, and was a South Island selector from 1965 to 1968.

References

1901 births
1973 deaths
Canterbury rugby union players
New Zealand international rugby union players
New Zealand rugby union coaches
New Zealand rugby union players
People educated at Gore High School
Rugby union centres
Rugby union fly-halves
Rugby union players from Otago
Wellington rugby union players